Martinsville Sanitarium is a historic mineral water sanitarium located at Martinsville, Morgan County, Indiana.  It was built in 1925–1926, and is a -story, "oriental brick" and limestone building with an eclectic combination of Tudor Revival, Colonial Revival, Renaissance Revival, and Bungalow/American Craftsman style design elements.  The main section measures 160 feet by 55 feet and has two projecting wings.  It is topped by a cross-gabled hipped roof and features a sun porch, half-timbered gables, and overhanging eaves. The building faces the Martinsville Vandalia Depot.

It was listed on the National Register of Historic Places in 2005.

References

Hospital buildings on the National Register of Historic Places in Indiana
Tudor Revival architecture in Indiana
Bungalow architecture in Indiana
Hospital buildings completed in 1926
Buildings and structures in Morgan County, Indiana
National Register of Historic Places in Morgan County, Indiana